Jan Bohdan Dembowski (26 December 1889 – 22 September 1963) was a Polish biologist and academic who was the first President of the Polish Academy of Sciences.

Biography 
Dembowski was born in Saint Petersburg, Russia and studied in the Saint Petersburg and Vienna universities.  

From 1919 to 1934 a researcher at the Nencki Institute of Experimental Biology of the Polish Academy of Sciences in Warsaw. From 1920 to 1930 a professor at the Free Polish University  and from 1922 to 1934 he was an associate professor at the University of Warsaw.  He was a professor at the Vilnius University and after the Soviet annexation of Lithuania he became a lecturer at the Marxism-Leninism University in Vilnius. 

In years 1929–1939 he was the editor-in-chief of popular-science journal Wszechświat. 

During World War II he became involved in the Polish Union of Patriots. He became the first president of the Polish Academy of Sciences (1952–1956), marshal of the Sejm (1952–1957) and Deputy Chairman of the Polish Council of State (1952–1957).

In the years 1948–1952 chairman of the Polish Committee of the Defenders of Peace. In November 1949 he became a member of the National Committee for the Celebration of the 70th anniversary of the birth of Joseph Stalin. In 1951–1953 chairman of the State Awards Committee, in 1952–1956 deputy chairman of the National Committee of the National Front. On 6 March 1953 he joined the National Committee to Commemorate Joseph Stalin.

Dembowski was a member of the Circle of Marxist Naturalists and was a leading figure for the promotion of Lysenkoism in Poland.  

He was awarded the Order of the Builders of Polish People's Republic and also received the Commander's Cross with Star of the Order of Polonia Restituta. In 1949 and 1955 state winner of the first degree, a member of the Academy of Sciences and foreign - USSR Academy of Sciences (honorary member), the Hungarian Academy of Sciences, Academy of Sciences in New York. 

Jan Dembowski died, aged 73, in Warsaw, he received a state funeral and was buried at the Powązki Military Cemetery.

References

1889 births
1963 deaths
Polish biologists
Commanders with Star of the Order of Polonia Restituta
Scientists from Warsaw
Members of the Polish Sejm 1952–1956
Presidents of the Polish Academy of Sciences
Marshals of the Sejm
20th-century biologists

References 

University of Vienna alumni
Saint Petersburg State University alumni
Academic staff of the University of Łódź
Academic staff of the University of Warsaw
Burials at Powązki Military Cemetery